Jack McKnight (born 10 June 1994) is a Turks and Caicos Islands footballer. Born in England, he represents the Turks and Caicos Islands internationally.

Career statistics

International

References

1994 births
Living people
Association football forwards
Turks and Caicos Islands footballers
Turks and Caicos Islands expatriate footballers
Turks and Caicos Islands international footballers
Expatriate association footballers in the Republic of Ireland
AFC Academy players